The Josephine Baker Story is an American television film that first aired on HBO on March 16, 1991. It stars Lynn Whitfield as Josephine Baker, who was an international African-American star, who was especially successful in Europe. The film was generally well received by critics and has become a success on home video and DVD. The original music score was composed by Georges Delerue. The film was nominated for several awards and won 5 Emmy Awards for art direction, costume design, hairstyling, directing by Brian Gibson and for acting by Lynn Whitfield.

Plot
Born into a poor family in St. Louis, Josephine Baker struggles to make a name for herself on the vaudeville circuit. As her career progresses, so does her resentment of racial prejudice, motivating her to move to Paris—where in a short time, her exotic dance routines make her the toast of the town. Swayed by the influence of her manager, she takes the act back to America. It fails, but Josephine perseveres, proving herself as much humanitarian as entertainer.

Cast 
Lynn Whitfield as Josephine Baker
Mayah McCoy as Josephine Baker Age 8
Ainsley Curry as Josephine Baker Age 13
Rubén Blades as Count Giuseppe Pepito Abatino
David Dukes as Jo Bouillon
Louis Gossett Jr. as Sidney Williams
Craig T. Nelson as Walter Winchell
Kene Holliday as Sidney Bechet
Vivian Bonnell as Josephine's mother
Vivienne Eytle as Josephine's sister

Production
Lynn Whitfield was glad to be chosen to play Josephine Baker in this movie, but she was concerned about the scene requiring her to bare her breasts to perform Baker's famous "Banana Dance." "I was nervous about what my grandmother would think," she said, but then she warmed to the idea: "It's what you think Eve would look like."

Accolades 
At the Golden Globe Awards, the film was nominated for "Best Limited Series, Anthology Series or Television Motion Picture", Lynn Whitfield was nominated for "Best Actress - Limited Series, Anthology Series or Television Motion Picture", and Louis Gossett Jr. won "Best Supporting Actor - Television".

References

External links
 
 

1991 television films
1991 films
1990s biographical drama films
African-American biographical dramas
American biographical drama films
Biographical films about entertainers
Films scored by Georges Delerue
HBO Films films
Cultural depictions of Josephine Baker
1990s English-language films
Films directed by Brian Gibson
1990s American films